Dicranoptycha nigripes is a species of limoniid crane fly in the family Limoniidae.

References

Limoniidae
Articles created by Qbugbot
Taxa named by Carl Robert Osten-Sacken
Insects described in 1859